Samuel Holland Burns (born July 23, 1996) is an American professional golfer who plays on the PGA Tour. He played his college golf at Louisiana State University. In 2021, he won the Valspar Championship and the Sanderson Farms Championship.

Amateur career
Burns was born in Shreveport, Louisiana, to Todd and Beth Burns. During his prep career at Calvary Baptist Academy, he was a three-time individual state champion. He was named AJGA Rolex Junior Player of the Year in 2014. Burns played college golf at Louisiana State University, where he won four tournaments in 15 collegiate starts during his sophomore season. He was named a first-team All-American and was the NCAA Division I Jack Nicklaus National Player of the Year for the 2016–17 season. Burns represented the United States on the winning 2017 Arnold Palmer Cup team and he qualified for the PGA Tour's 2017 Barbasol Championship, where he finished T6.

Professional career
In October 2017, Burns made his PGA Tour debut as a professional at the Sanderson Farms Championship. After finishing T43, he played a week later at the Shriners Hospitals for Children Open and finished T20. Burns earned guaranteed starts for the first 12 Web.com Tour events of the 2018 season with his T10 finish at the final stage of the Web.com Tour Qualifying Tournament. He finished T2 at the Colombia Championship in February 2018. Burns finished T7 at the Honda Classic with Tiger Woods as his playing partner in the final round, earning Burns entry into the Valspar Championship, where he finished T12. Burns earned his first professional win at the 2018 Savannah Golf Championship on the Web.com Tour when he birdied each of the final three holes to defeat Roberto Castro by one stroke. He gained a place on the PGA Tour at the end of the 2018 Web.com season.

Burns has played on the PGA Tour since the start of the 2018–19 season. In February 2021, he finished solo third place at the Genesis Invitational, one shot outside of the playoff with Tony Finau and Max Homa, Homa being the eventual winner. Burns held the solo lead at the end of each of the first three rounds but was ultimately caught on the back 9 during the final round.  In May, Burns won the Valspar Championship for his first PGA Tour victory. Burns shot a final round 68 to win by three strokes over Keegan Bradley. Two weeks later Burns finished runner-up to K.H. Lee at the AT&T Byron Nelson.

On October 3, 2021, Burns won his second PGA Tour title at the Sanderson Farms Championship in Jackson, Mississippi. On March 20, 2022, Burns won his second consecutive Valspar Championship title, beating Davis Riley in a playoff. On May 29, 2022, Burns won the Charles Schwab Challenge after making a 38-foot birdie putt in a playoff against Scottie Scheffler. Burns overcame a seven stroke deficit to win, matching Nick Price in 1994 for largest comeback in a final round to win at Colonial Country Club.

Burns qualified for the U.S. team at the 2022 Presidents Cup; he tied two and lost three of the five matches he played.

Personal life
Burns is a Christian. He is married to Caroline Burns.

Burns has been a supporter of Compassion International's "Fill the Stadium" initiative, an initiative "which seeks to provide food, medical supplies and other forms of support to children and their families during the COVID-19 pandemic."

Amateur wins
2014 AJGA Rolex Tournament of Champions, Junior PGA Championship
2016 David Toms Intercollegiate, Sun Bowl Western Refining College All-America Golf Classic
2017 Louisiana Classics, NCAA Baton Rouge Regional

Professional wins (5)

PGA Tour wins (4)

PGA Tour playoff record (2–1)

Web.com Tour wins (1)

Results in major championships
Results not in chronological order in 2020.

CUT = missed the half-way cut
"T" indicates a tie for a place
WD = withdrew
NT = No tournament due to COVID-19 pandemic

Summary

Most consecutive cuts made – 3 (2022 PGA – 2022 Open Championship, current)
Longest streak of top-10s – 0

Results in The Players Championship

CUT = missed the halfway cut
"T" indicates a tie for a place

Results in World Golf Championships

1Canceled due to COVID-19 pandemic

"T" = Tied
NT = No tournament
Note that the Championship and Invitational were discontinued from 2022.

U.S. national team appearances
Amateur
Junior Ryder Cup: 2014 (winners)
Arnold Palmer Cup: 2017 (winners)

Professional
Presidents Cup: 2022 (winners)

See also
2018 Web.com Tour Finals graduates

References

External links
 
 
 Profile on LSU's official athletic site

American male golfers
LSU Tigers golfers
PGA Tour golfers
Korn Ferry Tour graduates
Golfers from Shreveport, Louisiana
Golfers from Texas
Sportspeople from Tyler, Texas
1996 births
Living people